André Germain (1903–1988) was a French cinematographer active from the mid-1930s to the late 1960s.

Selected filmography
 Rail Pirates (1938)
 Beating Heart (1940)
 Love Cavalcade (1940)
 Beating Heart (1940)
 Son of France (1946)
 Two Loves (1949)
 Marlene (1949)
 The Man on the Eiffel Tower (1949)
 Casimir (1950)
 Dakota 308 (1951)
 Come Down, Someone Wants You (1951)
 Rendezvous in Grenada (1951)
 Good Enough to Eat (1951)
 After You Duchess (1954)
 The Price of Love (1955)
 The Babes in the Secret Service (1956)
 The Seventh Commandment (1957)
 Send a Woman When the Devil Fails (1957)
 On Foot, on Horse, and on Wheels (1957)
 Let's Be Daring, Madame (1957)
 The Bureaucrats (1959)
 Daniella by Night (1961)
 Mission to Venice (1964)

References

Bibliography
 Klossner, Michael. The Europe of 1500-1815 on Film and Television: A Worldwide Filmography of Over 2550 Works, 1895 Through 2000. McFarland & Company, 2002.
  Raimondo-Souto, H. Mario. Motion Picture Photography: A History, 1891-1960. McFarland, 2006.

External links

1903 births
1988 deaths
French cinematographers
People from Allier

fr:André Germain